Monster was a ska-punk band from Sweden that split up in 2000. They released two albums: Rockers Delight (1997), Gone Gone Gone/A Bash Dem (1999) and some EPs. Their singer Anders Wendin now has a solo project called Moneybrother, other band members are now with The Concretes.

This band was formed in Stockholm when Wendin was about 19 years old.  The band had horns and organs, and went on tour with other bands such as The Hives.

Discography 
 Honour Your Friends (1995)
 Looking For a Fight (1997)
 Rockers Delight  (1997)
 You'll Be Sorry (1997)
 A Brief History Of Monster (1998)
 Gone, Gone, Gone/A Bash Dem (1999)

Footnotes

Monster (band)
Musical groups disestablished in 2000
2000 establishments in Sweden